Ayu is a feminine given name with Japanese and Javanese origins. Notable people with may refer to:

People
, former pornographic (AV) actress
, Japanese football player
 Ayu Tsukimiya, a character in the visual novel Kanon
 Ayu Tateishi, a character from the manga and anime Ultra Maniac
 Ayu, a nickname of Japanese singer Ayumi Hamasaki

Japanese feminine given names